The Chesterfield County School District is a school district that governs public schools in Chesterfield County, South Carolina.  Since 1968, Chesterfield County has operated a single school district which now consists of two primary schools, seven elementary/intermediate schools, three middle schools, and four high schools. Total enrollment in the county's public schools for 2009 is estimated to be 8,000 students.

Schools

High schools
Central High School, Pageland
Cheraw High School, Cheraw
Chesterfield High School, Chesterfield
McBee High School, McBee

Middle schools
Chesterfield/Ruby Middle School, Chesterfield/Ruby
Long Middle School, Cheraw
New Heights Middle School, Jefferson
Robius Middle School

Elementary schools
Cheraw Intermediate School, Cheraw
Edwards Elementary School, Chesterfield
Jefferson Elementary School, Jefferson
McBee Elementary School, McBee
Pageland Elementary School, Pageland
Plainview Elementary School, Plainview
Ruby Elementary School, Ruby

Primary schools
Cheraw Primary School, Cheraw
Petersburg Primary School, Pageland

References

 
Education in Chesterfield County, South Carolina
School districts in South Carolina
1968 establishments in South Carolina